Boxmeer is a railway station located in Boxmeer, Netherlands. The station was opened on 1 June 1883 and is located on the Nijmegen–Venlo railway. The station is currently operated by Arriva.

Train services
The following local train services call at this station:
Stoptrein: Nijmegen–Venlo–Roermond
Stoptrein: Nijmegen–Venray

External links
NS website 
Dutch public transport travel planner 

Railway stations in North Brabant
Railway stations opened in 1883
Railway stations on the Maaslijn
Buildings and structures in Land van Cuijk
Transport in Land van Cuijk